The Bosnian Crusade was fought against unspecified heretics from 1235 until 1241. It was, essentially, a Hungarian war of conquest against the Banate of Bosnia sanctioned as a crusade. Led by the Hungarian prince Coloman, the crusaders succeeded in conquering only peripheral parts of the country. They were followed by Dominicans, who erected a cathedral and put heretics to death by burning. The crusade came to an abrupt end when Hungary itself was invaded by the Mongols during the Mongol invasion of Europe. The crusaders were forced to withdraw and engage their own invaders, most of them perishing, including Coloman. Later popes called for more crusades against Bosnia, but none ever took place. The failed crusade led to mistrust and hatred for Hungarians among the Bosnian population that lasted for centuries.

Background 

Several crusades were called against Bosnia, a country long deemed infested with heresy by both the rest of Catholic Europe and its Eastern Orthodox neighbours. The first crusade was averted in April 1203, when Bosnians under Ban Kulin promised to practice Christianity according to the Roman Catholic rite and recognized the spiritual supremacy of the bishop of Rome (pope). Kulin also reaffirmed the secular supremacy of the kings of Hungary over Bosnia. In effect, however, the independence of both the Bosnian Church and Banate of Bosnia continued to grow.

At the height of the Albigensian Crusade against French Cathars in the 1220s, a rumour broke out that a "Cathar antipope", called Nicetas, was residing in Bosnia. It has never been clear whether Nicetas existed, but the neighbouring Hungarians took advantage of the spreading rumour to reclaim suzerainty over Bosnia, which had been growing increasingly independent. Bosnians were accused of being sympathetic to Bogomilism, a Christian sect closely related to Catharism and likewise dualist. In 1221, the concern finally prompted Pope Honorius III to preach a crusade against Bosnia. He repeated this in 1225, but internal problems prevented the Hungarians from answering his call.

Honorius III's successor, Pope Gregory IX, accused the Catholic bishop of Bosnia himself of sheltering heretics, in addition to illiteracy, simony, ignorance of the baptismal formula and failure to celebrate mass and sacraments. He was duly deposed in 1233 and replaced with a German Dominican prelate, John of Wildeshausen, the first non-Bosnian bishop of Bosnia. The same year, Ban Matthew Ninoslav abandoned an unspecified heresy, but this did not satisfy Gregory.

Conflict 

In 1234, Pope Gregory IX issued another call for crusade, and this time Hungary readily responded. While it is possible that the Bosnians had failed to align their church with Rome, the crusade actually served as a perfect excuse for the Hungarians to expand their authority. Gregory promised indulgence to prospective crusaders and entrusted Coloman, younger son of Andrew II and brother of Béla IV, with executing the military action. Coloman and his followers were put under protection of the Holy See. Neither the enemies nor the targeted region were precisely named in the letters the Pope sent to Coloman and the Bishop of Bosnia. He referred to "Slavonia", mentioning "lands of Bosnia" only in the letter to the Bishop. It is generally understood that, by "Slavonia", he meant Bosnia and its surroundings, Slavic lands, or even to actual Slavonia. The fact that the Bishop of Bosnia was informed, however, makes it clear that Bosnia itself was targeted. The action seems to have been taken against Bosnians in general as only "heretics" are mentioned; it is implied in one source that the crusade was directed against dualists.

Active fighting began in 1235, but the Hungarian army only reached Bosnia proper three years later. The delay may have been caused by the popular resistance in the north of the country, namely Soli, where the mountainous terrain helped "many heretics" defend against the crusaders. In August 1236, Pope Gregory ordered the crusaders not to pester Matthew Ninoslav's relative Sibislav, knez of Usora, or his mother, both "good Catholics" among heretical nobility, "lilies among thorns". Vrhbosna apparently fell in 1238, when a cathedral was constructed by Dominicans who followed the crusaders. The crusaders failed to conquer all of Bosnia, however, as Matthew Ninoslav continued to act as ban throughout the conflict in the central parts of his realm, where Dominicans never set foot. The order took control of the Catholic Church in Bosnia, now led by a new bishop, a Hungarian named Ponsa. The Dominicans recorded that some heretics were burned at the stake, but do not appear to have discovered anything about the nature of the heresy. The crusaders then either reached as far south as Zachlumia or intended to do so.

Then, in 1241, the Mongol invasion of Europe saved Bosnia. The Mongols under Batu Khan, having subdued and devastated Kievan Rus', invaded Hungary. The Hungarian troops were forced to withdraw from Bosnia and face their own invaders. Much of their army was wiped out in the Battle of Mohi; Coloman, commander of the crusaders, was among those killed. The Mongols plundered Dalmatia, Croatia, Zeta, Serbia and Bulgaria. Their attack proved disastrous for all of the Balkans but Bosnia. The crusaders were annihilated, never to return. Bosnia retook the occupied territories and maintained its level of independence following what turned out to be a Hungarian war of conquest sanctioned as a crusade.

Aftermath and legacy 

The threat of new religious persecution in Bosnia reappeared within a few years of the war. Pope Innocent IV began urging the Hungarians to undertake another crusade in late 1246 and 1247, and they appeared willing. Matthew Ninoslav argued that he only associated with heretics to defend Bosnia against Hungarian invaders. He appears to have convinced Innocent, who suspended the crusade in March 1248.

A crusade against Bosnia was preached again in 1337–38 and 1367, by popes Benedict XII and Urban V, respectively, but in drastically different political circumstances. Hungary was ruled by a new dynasty, the Capetian Angevins, who supported the Kotromanić rulers of Bosnia. King Charles Robert once declared that any Hungarian who attacked Bosnia, ruled by his friend Stephen II, would be regarded as a traitor. The only significant impact the Bosnian Crusade had was augmenting the anti-Hungarian sentiment among the Bosnians, a major factor in Bosnian politics that contributed to the Ottoman conquest of Bosnia in 1463 and lasted beyond it.

References 

13th-century crusades
13th century in Bosnia
Catharism
Catholic Church in Bosnia and Herzegovina
Wars involving Hungary
Persecution of Christian heretics
Bosnian Church
Battles involving the Banate of Bosnia
Wars involving medieval Bosnian state